is a Japanese pop singer and idol pop singer signed to Hello! Project as a member of Japanese pop idol group Juice=Juice and Hello! Pro Kenshuusei. She was first introduced at the 2012 March Nama Tamago Show! concert.

Uemura is represented by Up-Front Promotion.

Biography
Uemura was recommended to Hello! Project by her aunt and was rejected in the third-order examinations of the 9th Morning Musume Audition. She later had a chance in her audition by taking dance lessons as a trainee in Osaka. Uemura was introduced at the Hello Puro Kenshuusei Happyoukai 2012: 3-tsuki no Nama Tamago Show! on 31 March 2012. In February 2013, she was chosen as a member of Juice=Juice.

Discography
for Akari Uemura's releases with Juice=Juice, see Juice=Juice#Discography.

Filmography

Stage

Radio

References

External links
 

1998 births
Living people
Japanese idols
Japanese women pop singers
Juice=Juice members
Musicians from Osaka Prefecture